The 2004 Uzbek League season was the 13th edition of top level football in Uzbekistan since independence from the Soviet Union in 1992. Pakhtakor were the defending champions from the 2003 campaign.

Overview
The season began on 4 March 2004 and concluded on 20 November 2004. The League reduced from 16 to 14 teams because Kokand 1912 and Dustlik were excluded from 2004 season for being unable to pay their debts to the UFF from the previous season (2003). Pakhtakor Tashkent won the championship.

League table

Season statistics

Top goalscorers

References
Uzbekistan - List of final tables (RSSSF)

Uzbekistan Super League seasons
1
Uzbek
Uzbek